Army Group East (G. A. E.) was a grouping of French field armies during World War I, which was created on June 22, 1915 from the  (G. P. E.) which had been formed in January 1915. The army group covered the Western Front from the Swiss border to roughly east of Verdun.

Composition

July 1, 1915 
from North to South :
 3rd Army (général Maurice Sarrail)
 Détachement d'armée de Lorraine (DAL) (général George Humbert)
 7th Army (général Louis de Maud'huy)

February 15, 1917 
From West to East :
 8th Army (général Augustin Gérard)
 7th Army (général Marie-Eugène Debeney)

May 25, 1918 
From West to East :
 2nd Army (général Auguste Hirschauer)
 8th Army (général Augustin Gérard)
 7th Army (général Antoine de Boissoudy)

Commanders 
 Général Augustin Dubail (July 1, 1915 – March 31, 1916)
 Général Louis Franchet d'Espèrey (March 31, 1916 – December 27, 1916)
 Général Édouard de Castelnau (December 27, 1916 – December 1918)

Sources 
 The French Army and the First World War by Elizabeth Greenhalgh
 Philippe Pétain et Marc Ferro (Avant-propos), La Guerre mondiale : 1914–1918, Toulouse, Éditions Privat, 2014, 372 p. (OCLC 891408727)
 Victor Giraud, Histoire de la Grande Guerre, Paris, Librairie Hachette, 1920, 777 p.

Military units and formations of France in World War I
Military units and formations established in 1915
Army groups of France
Army groups of World War I